This is a list of years in Cameroon.

16th century

17th century

18th century

19th century

20th century

21st century

See also
 Timeline of Douala
 Timeline of Yaoundé
List of years by country

Bibliography

External links
 

 
Cameroon history-related lists
Cameroon